"Homecoming" is a song by American hip-hop recording artist Kanye West. It was included as the twelfth song on his third studio album Graduation (2007). The track was produced by West with Warryn Campbell and features a guest appearance from Chris Martin, lead vocalist of the British alternative rock band Coldplay. Martin sings the song's chorus and outro and provides a piano-driven motif. The song is a hip hop beat with pop-oriented refrains while also integrating elements of post-punk and new wave with arena rock sensibilities. "Homecoming" is written as a tribute dedicated to West's hometown of Chicago, Illinois. His conceptual lyricism expresses an extended metaphor where he personifies Chicago as a childhood sweetheart to convey his relationship with the city.

A reworking of a track entitled "Home (Windy)," the song first originated from a 2001 demo tape. While the lyrical content of the verses largely remain the same, the lyrics of the chorus for the original incarnation of "Homecoming" are different and were sung by singer John Legend. In addition, this recording had exhibited West's once trademark soulful vocal sample production style. "Homecoming" came about when West met Martin for the first time by chance at the famed Abbey Road Studios in London in February 2006. Afterwards, the two held an impromptu jam session and recorded the track, with Martin requesting that West alter the tone of his approach to the songwriting and production.

Although it was intended be the lead single of Graduation, the song was released as the fifth and final single from the album on February 18, 2008. The single was met with moderate commercial success in the United States and Canada. It was more successful overseas, peaking in the top twenty on European charts and reaching the top-ten positions in Ireland and the United Kingdom. "Homecoming" has since been certified Platinum by the Recording Industry Association of America (RIAA).

Upon its release, "Homecoming" received mixed reviews from contemporary music critics. Though West was complimented for his introspective lyricism and storytelling abilities, Martin's contribution was met with polarizing reactions, with many criticizing his appearance due to him not being from Chicago. An accompanying music video for the single was directed by Hype Williams and filmed in Chicago. Shot entirely in black-and-white, the video features a montage of West traversing the streets of Chicago and showcases its landmarks, monuments and people. The music video was very well-received and praised for the way West's hometown is visually paid homage. It was nominated for Best Hip-Hop Video at the 2008 MTV Video Music Awards.

Background

"Homecoming" was released on Graduation (2007), the third studio album by American hip-hop recording artist and record producer Kanye West. It was written by West with Chris Martin, lead vocalist of the English alternative rock band Coldplay. West co-produced the track with record producer Warryn Campbell. For the song, sharp piano flourishes were dressed over booming, stadium-sized drums to accompany a sing-along chorus. The collaboration between West and Martin occurred when the two teamed up for an impromptu jam session following a chance encounter on February 14, 2006 at the Abbey Road Studios located in London, England. During the session, they composed the number by making alterations to the instrumental and lyrical content of one of West's earlier recordings.

Even though it was included on his 2007 studio album, "Homecoming" was actually a reworking of a track known as "Home (Windy)" that originated from a demo tape dating back to the year 2001. "Home (Windy)" circulated under the new title "Home" on various mixtapes that West released over the years, beginning with his 2003 mixtape Get Well Soon... "Home" was also available on the advance copy of West's debut studio album, The College Dropout (2004). However, that version of his first album was never released due to being leaked months before its intended initial release date of August 12, 2003. West used the opportunity to refine The College Dropout, as the studio album was significantly remixed, remastered, and revised prior to being released on February 10, 2004. In the end, certain tracks originally destined for The College Dropout were subsequently retracted, with "Home" being among them.

The composition was later described as "very emotional" by Kanye West during a retrospective interview with Concrete Loop on October 5, 2007. In the interview, he imparted that "Homecoming" was among his three most favorite songs from Graduation. "Home (Windy)" had been written by West as a heartfelt homage dedicated to the city of Chicago, Illinois. The track paid lyrical tribute to Kanye West's hometown of Chicago. Its deeply personal lyrical content expounds upon West's relationship with Chicago, expressing a metaphoric narrative which features a feminized personification of his hometown. During the story, West nostalgically rhymes about growing up Chicago, his love for the city, and his guilt over leaving "her" in order to pursue his musical dreams. He lyrically references "I Used to Love H.E.R.," a 1994 rap song written by his close friend, former GOOD Music label affiliate, and fellow Chicago hip-hop artist Common. The rapper would go on to make cameo appearances in the single's accompanying music video, which was filmed in the city of Chicago. Dressed in a new Chris Martin chorus but primarily containing the same rap lyrics, "Homecoming" still manages to resonate as a jubilant, loving ode to West's Chicago upbringing. It is but one of several references to footsteps which once propelled him forward as a hip-hop artist that are found throughout his introspective third album Graduation.

Writing and development
Aside from a slight variation applied towards his initial spoken ad-libs and opening lines in order to compose an introduction, the lyrics of West's rap verse were largely left the same. Although the new sung chorus of "Homecoming" which Chris Martin delivers contains a set of lines that are entirely different from that of John Legend's. Chris Martin was the one who requested the changes that West made to the original lyrical content. On the chorus of "Home," John Legend sang about soldiers who did not make it back and come home. However, Martin felt the tone of West's conceptual approach to the track was too somber, and suggested it be recontextualized with a "happier" concept. As a result, on the chorus of "Homecoming," Chris Martin sings about Kanye West returning to his hometown of Chicago, Illinois. Inspired by his worldwide arena tour with Irish rock band U2, West redesigned the song to perform as a stadium anthem. Accordingly, the new composition expresses soaring, infectious vocal melodies and hooks in addition to memorable singalong choruses. Meanwhile, the rhythmic piano accompaniment of the arrangement is laden with energetic minor chords.

Alongside Coldplay, during the period of the recording and production of Graduation (2007), West was primarily listening to mainstream rock bands such as Keane, The Killers, and Radiohead in an effort to make his rap songs more palatable for stadium concerts. Consequently, "Homecoming" retains a piano-driven, arena ready soundscape comparable to the music of Coldplay and these bands. However, West had Chris Martin forgo his typical midtempo balladry in favor of flashier, inspirational piano work. Martin's pounding piano playing displays a gospel influence recurrent in West's productions, while the rest of the rhythm section harbors characteristics of reggae. The moving piano motif was structured in such a way that it began on the off-beat to give the recording a rawer, hip-hop vibe. Also evident within its stripped-down instrumentation, minor-key composition, and stop-start arrangement lies West's subtle yet growing inclination towards post-punk and new wave tendencies.

While making modifications to the composition, West rearranged the structured of the storytelling framework for its lyrical content. He chose to utilise a more conventional formal structure typically found in rap songs while incorporating his pop sensibilities into the newly written chorus. West took his original one single verse from "Home" which was thirty-two bars in length, divided its lyrics into two separate sixteen-bar verses and them organized around a chorus section. Even though his lines were mostly unchanged, West would rap them in a tighter, more assured flow with clearer enunciation than on the original version, indicative of years of experience and increased lyrical dexterity. Compared to John Legend's soulful singing, Chris Martin delivers the pop chorus of "Homecoming" with a smoother, straightforward rendition. He recites his elastic refrain and bridge in a breezy sing-along manner, making the record come off more upbeat. Martin's singing laspes into a soft, ethereal falsetto and uses laid-back crooning to maintain a sense of nostalgic wistfulness.

Recording

The recording sessions for "Home (Windy)" and "Homecoming" took place over the course of several years at five different studio locations. These recording studios include the Fever Recording Studio in North Hollywood, Los Angeles, the Abbey Road Studios in London, England, the Sony Music Studios in New York City, and The Record Plant and Ocean Way Recording in Hollywood, California. The track was mixed at Chalice Recording Studios in Hollywood, California and Chung King Studios in New York City. The earliest studio recordings of "Home (Windy)" were made as far back as the year 2001. The track's instrumental brandished the hallmarks of West's once trademark hip-hop production technique. It featured a soulful vocal sample of harmonious belting vocals from Patti LaBelle and the BlueBelles's cover of the 1945 show tune, "You'll Never Walk Alone." Meanwhile, the original lyrics of the song's chorus were sung by singer John Legend. He at the time was a largely unknown recording artist and went by the name of John Stephens. "Home (Windy)" is among the earliest in a long history of the two close friends collaborating with one another, as West would go on to produce the singer's debut studio album Get Lifted (2004) the very same year he released his own first album The College Dropout, whose tracks Legend in turn also lent his vocals to.

Years later, Kanye West and Chris Martin met each other for the very first time by chance on February 14, 2006 at Abbey Road, the iconic recording studios in London, England. At this point is his career, West was traveling the world rather than have recording artists and producers come to him for musical collaborations. He would go around and meet other record producers in locations such as New York, Atlanta and London, then return to The Record Plant for additional sound treatment. One day, West had just finished up a show at Abbey Road and Coldplay happened to be recording music in a studio there at the same time. As the rock band was recording a radio gig they held at Abbey Road for the national radio station BBC Radio 2, West was producing the theme song for the soundtrack of the 2006 action film Mission: Impossible III. According to audio engineer Andrew Dawson, Martin showed up after discovering that West was working in the very next studio. Upon their encounter, West did not mind the interruption by Chris Martin and after the band's show, the two joined in a recording booth for an impromptu jam session.

West and Chris Martin recorded "Homecoming" in the same room that The Beatles recorded their music, using the very same microphones. Martin reportedly wore exactly the same attire over the course of the several days the track was recorded, which is something of a habit for the musician. At the time of the re-recording, West had ready an unused hip-hop beat intended for what went on to become "Heard 'Em Say," the third single from his sophomore album Late Registration (2005). But Chris Martin reportedly advocated, "No this track's beat needs to be more like a homecoming or something." West subsequently retracted the looped soul sample repeated that was throughout "Home" and had it replaced insead with a pompous piano riff, which he decorated over stadium-friendly drums. Most of the tracks on Graduation had contained glossy, layered synthesizer-based productions influenced by West's experimentation with electronic music. But on "Homecoming," he opted for different, more stripped-down instrumental to complement the introspective quality of its triumphant yet melancholic lyrics.

For the track, West reduced usage of synthesisers and effects, stripping its backbeat down to the sparest stomp and clap to accommodate his poignant storytelling rhymes. Rather than synths, the syncopated piano part acts as the centerpiece of the song and works with a ponderous, melodic bassline to form a rhythmic figure which generates interlocking grooves. The track was ornamented with the use of additional percussion instruments and is subtly layered by a monotonous presence of crowd cheers that West injected into the mix to supplement the beat. When word got out that West and Chris Martin were working together in the studio, a source claimed that their recording, "sound[ed] like a Coldplay song with a beat, which is exactly what [Kanye] wanted." After having the opportunity to hear their record for himself, Jay-Z decided to also invite Chris Martin to make a guest appearance on one of his songs. Their collaboration would result in the track "Beach Chair" on Jay-Z's comeback album, Kingdom Come (2006). Jay-Z was swift to release "Beach Chair" on his ninth studio album a year prior to the release date of Graduation.

Composition

"Homecoming" is a midtempo hip-hop song that runs for a duration of three minutes and twenty-six seconds. The track is a gospel-inflected piano jam which harbors various instrumental nuances and vocal cues from music genres encompassing reggae, pub rock, post-punk, new wave, and pop rock. Essentially, the basis of the musical composition involves a synthesis of the sparse rhythmic pulse of reggae with the punchy yet articulate structure and brevity of post-punk alongside quirky new wave sound effects. Furthermore, the soaring refrains and strident piano riff implement catchy pop hooks and breezy melodies that express an arena rock aesthetic. The track's rhythmic instrumentation consists of staccato piano chords, percussion-backed drums, and syncopated, melodic bass lines.

According to the sheet music published at Musicnotes.com by EMI Music Publishing, the song is set in the time signature of common time, with a moderate tempo of 88 beats per minute. "Homecoming" is written in the key of E minor, and Chris Martin's vocal range spans from a low of D4 to a high of E5. The musical composition uses four-measure phrases which follow a basic sequence of Em–D/F#–Em/G–G–Am7–D/C–Cmaj7–Bm7 as its chord progression. Opening with a hammering E minor triad, "Homecoming" begins West shouting, "Yeah! And you say Chi city! Chi city! Chi city!" over a prominent piano motif. The uplifting piano accompaniment runs throughout the entire composition as its main instrument. The piano arrangement begins on the off-beat and each period ends with a single note stab followed by nearly a bar of silence. All throughout the track, the noisy sounds of a cheering crowd can inexplicably be heard lurking in the background.

Within two verses, West does his emotive rapping atop a heavy yet buoyant, percussion-backed drum beat. West raps his less intricate verses at a gradual pace with a flow that relies on end rhymes and manages to punctuate both the piano melodies and rhythms of the song. There are momentary rests and occasional piano flourishes at certain intervals within the instrumental to highlight West's lyricism and indicate transitions between sections. Meanwhile, Chris Martin supplies the energetic piano playing and sings the freewheeling chorus. His keening, high countertenor vocals garnered comparisons to that of musician and singer-songwriter Sting, frontman of the British post-punk band The Police. Martin sings a percussive yet melodic refrain with smooth, laid-back crooning hooks over a bouncing groove generated by the chugging piano progressions, lumbering bassline and stomping rhythm of the track's off-beat kick drum, yet another an element of reggae. Towards the end, Chris Martin even opts to perform the song's outro in a manner strongly reminiscent to a reggae singer. His usage of "le-yo-oh-oh" ululations invokes that of the vocal stylings of Jamaican musician Bob Marley.

Lyrically, "Homecoming" serves as an homage to Kanye West's hometown of Chicago, Illinois. In comparison to previous records, Graduation was at times thematically distanced, introspective and characterized by more conflicted, confessional storytelling. The jubilant ode to his Chicago upbringing is among many touching callbacks to the footsteps that propelled West forward in his journey as a hip-hop artist found on his third studio album.  "Homecoming" is where West finds himself rapping about growing up in Chicago from the perspective of a local youth returning to his old neighborhood, recalling memories of old friends and a past love interest. Throughout the romantic narrative, West employs an extended metaphor in which he personifies the city as a childhood sweetheart named Wendy. He rhymes about his love for Chicago and his guilt over leaving "her" to pursue his musical dreams. West tells the story of how the childhood sweetheart slipped through his fingers with vivid lines. His evocative wordplay captures his bittersweet relationship with the place that made him which he once called home. Both the opening and closing lines lyrically reference "I Used to Love H.E.R.," a similar metaphoric rap song written by West's close friend, label affiliate, and fellow Chicago hip-hop artist Common. After each verse, Chris Martin sings a triumphant chorus about West making his return: "Do you think about me now and then? / 'Cause I'm coming home again."

Release and promotion
The initial news of West's musical collaboration with Coldplay frontman Chris Martin were reported by The Daily Star on February 24, 2006. West reportedly told the newspaper, "Chris Martin is definitely one of the people I study. He was completely bashful about the concept of doing a record. He wanted to work on the music because he loves music and working in the studio and adding his ideas." West later announced his collaboration with during an interview with Billboard on January 19, 2007. He stated that "Homecoming" was likely to be released as the lead single for his third album Graduation (2007). However, the track "Can't Tell Me Nothing" was released as the album's lead single instead, while "Homecoming" whereas was subsequently released as the fifth and final single. "Homecoming" was first heard by music listeners when the digital radio station BBC Radio 1Xtra hosted an exclusive "Audience With Kanye West" venue at the BBC Radio Music Theatre in London on August 13, 2007. West guided a specially selected audience through Graduation, playing the album in its entirety directly from his MacBook Air laptop via a speaker system. The premiere was part of an extensive promotional campaign that West embarked on for his third album during a trip to the United Kingdom. Two weeks later, "Homecoming" was one of the tracks that West played while hosting an album listening session for Graduation in New York City. The late-night album listening session was held at the New World Stages on August 28, 2007. Inside an auditorium, West explained the influences and aspirations that went into the making of his third album. Throughout the night, he played previews of its songs from start-to-finish without interruption, some with video accompaniment to match. When an audience member asked Kanye why the production of "Home" had been altered and become "Homecoming," he replied that he believed the original hip-hop beat wouldn't rock stadiums, but the song's lyrics were too good to go to waste.

Critical reception
Following its release, "Homecoming" received mixed reviews from contemporary music critics. Nick Levine from Digital Spy describes the track as an "impressive slow jam" and refers to Chris Martin as "the Sting of our times." Giving the single four out of five stars, Levine noted, "This could quite easily have become a crass exercise in mutual back-slapping, but, thankfully, Martin seems to have brought out West's inner softie, making 'Homecoming' the bragging rapper's most affecting moment to date." Pitchfork Media Mark Pytlik wrote that the song feels like it hits all the right notes. After his admittance that "Homecoming" exceeded his expectations, Jackie Im of Treblezine called track's hook incredibly catchy and summarizes the composition as a "nice little pop song that leads into Kanye's most earnest moment." He also compared Chris Martin's piano playing to that of English singer, pianist and composer Elton John. Similar sentiments were expressed by Jon Caramanica from The New York Times, who thought the piano jam recalls that of early Billy Joel. Writing for NME, Louis Pattison reported "Homecoming" as being a "solid" track while NOW Magazine editor Jason Richards labeled it as the highlight of Graduation. While he upholds the belief that Graduation contains "a couple of real clunkers," Kyle Ryan of The A.V. Club wrote that with songs like "Homecoming," the album also has "its usual share of West gold." Slant Magazine quipped that in contrast to Jay-Z's earlier collaboration with Chris Martin on "Beach Chair" from his comeback album Kingdom Come, West's track "just might make Coldplay acceptable for the cool kids again." Ann Powers, writer for Los Angeles Times, also held the belief that Kanye bests Jay-Z's use of Martin's vocal abilities. Sharing a similar sentiment, Paste reviewer Ross Bonaime wrote that when comparing the songs, West uses Martin in a much more successful manner and regards the combination of the two recording artists as "undeniably pretty great."
 
On the other hand, several music journalists questioned the authenticity of "Homecoming" due to the fact that Chris Martin doesn't hail from the city of Chicago. Calling the song an "interestingly flawed venture," Dorian Lynskey of The Guardian chided, "If you're rapping about growing up in Chicago, don't duet with a singer from Devon. Emote though he may, Chris Martin can't convince anyone that he is moved by the memory of 'fireworks over Lake Michigan.'" Nathan Rabin from The A.V. Club views the collaboration as a demonstration of how West's a broad musical palette can occasionally get him into trouble, saying that Chris Martin doesn't embody the rich musical heritage of Chicago. Exclaim! Del Cowie remarked that due in part to Martin's guest appearance, "Homecoming" doesn't evoke the emotional connection that a hometown ode should elicit. Labeling the track as one of the album's transgressions, Noah Love of ChartAttack stated that he could have done without Chris Martin crooning over the record and believed West was still finding his lane as a lyricist. Chicago Tribune music critic Greg Kot was dismissive of the song's instrumentation, saying, "Chris Martin coos over a cornball piano riff." He denounces that "Homecoming" falls flat and adds up to being the album's biggest misstep.

Accolades
Despite divided opinions regarding Chris Martin, "Homecoming" has managed to appear on several lists of West's best songs. Paste magazine ranks "Homecoming" as West's fifty-first best album track. Complex listed both the original John Legend version and the Chris Martin version of "Home"/"Homecoming" at thirty-eight among West's one-hundred best songs. "Homecoming" was also declared the fiftieth greatest Chicago rap song by Complex. To honor his thirty-ninth birthday, The Jamaica Observer composed a list of the top ten best songs Kanye West has ever made, in which "Homecoming" was included. Highsnobiety cited "Homecoming" as the fortieth best Kanye West song, referring to it as a "classic Kanye cut." For their list of Kanye West's 10 Most Stripped-Down, Minimal Songs, head writer Jordan Darville of ChartAttack placed "Homecoming" at number four. In regards to the track's inward lyricism, he wrote, "The synth-rap epics on Graduation are on a race to outdo each other, which make its introspective moments that much more deeply felt." Billboard cited "Homecoming" as among West's ten most romantic songs and stated that it is one of the most loving hometown tributes that rap music has to offer. CraveOnline ranked "Homecoming" at the very top of their list of Kanye West's fifteen best songs. When summarizing the composition, it stated, "Even though this storytelling track is very personal, and therefore not directly relatable, Kanye reaches its high point topically and instrumentally, proving his expertise as both a producer and a rapper. Coldplay's singer Chris Martin features on the chorus, but the main star of this track is the piano instrumental ... The love ode to Chicago turns out to be familiar to everyone, regardless of their location, class, gender or whether they've left their first home." Jeva Lange of The Week named it as West's best track, though Lange voiced the opinion that "With the exception of myself, nobody will tell you 'Homecoming' is West's magnum opus." "Homecoming" received a nomination for Best R&B/Hip-Hop Track at the 2008 Teen Choice Awards.

Chart performance
 In the United States, "Homecoming" made its first chart appearance on the Hot R&B/Hip-Hop Songs chart on May 22, 2008 at number sixty-eight. It eventually peaked at number fifty-three on the chart for the issue dated June 14, 2008. The single made its debut on the Billboard Hot 100 at number ninety-six, for the issue dated June 7, 2008. That very same week, "Homecoming" also entered at number nineteen on the US Hot Rap Songs chart. The next week, "Homecoming" climbed thirteen places to number eighty-three on the Hot 100 chart. For its third week on the Billboard Hot 100, "Homecoming" moved up a further twelve spaces to number seventy-one. In the end, the song reached its peak position at number sixty-nine on the Billboard Hot 100 for the issue dated June 28, 2008, which was its fourth week on the chart. Weeks later, for the issue dated July 12, 2008, "Homecoming" ascended to its peak position at number fifteen on the Hot Rap Songs chart. On April 1, 2015, "Homecoming" was certified Platinum by the Recording Industry Association of America (RIAA) for sales of one million paid digital downloads.

In Canada, "Homecoming" debuted at number eighty-nine on the Canadian Hot 100 chart, where it reached number seventy-nine. The single performed well overseas and was commercially success throughout much of Europe. It reached the top twenty in several countries, with its highest positions being in Ireland and the United Kingdom. "Homecoming" entered at number nineteen on Irish Singles Chart, being the highest debut for the week ending January 10, 2008. Two weeks later, the single ascended to its peak position at number five on the chart. "Homecoming" debuted at number seventy-seven on the UK Singles Chart for the issue date September 29, 2007 on download sales alone before relapsing. The song re-entered the chart at number sixty-nine for the issue dated December 30, 2007. It reached its peak position at number nine on the UK Singles Chart on January 20, 2008. According to the Official Charts Company, "Homecoming" has since sold 15,000 copies, being certified Gold by the British Phonographic Industry (BPI).

"Homecoming" was also a moderate success in Australia and New Zealand. In New Zealand, "Homecoming" made its debut at number thirty-eight on the New Zealand Singles Chart, and over the course of six weeks eventually rose to its peak position at number twenty-two. The song entered at number forty-seven on the Australian ARIA Singles Chart, peaking at number thirty-two a week later. "Homecoming" was certified Gold by the Australian Recording Industry Association (ARIA) for the shipment of 35,000 copies.

Music video

Background

The accompanying music video for "Homecoming" was directed by Hype Williams and filmed on location in the city of Chicago on November 6, 2007. It was the latest in a long history of collaborations between Williams and West, as the two had previously worked together in the past on several music videos, including for that of "Can't Tell Me Nothing" and "Stronger," the lead singles of West's third studio album, Graduation (2007). The music video was filmed entirely in black-and-white, with Williams taking a simplistic approach for the visuals. For the video, West dressed in a designer classic-fit Stüssy flannel madras plaid shirt beneath a sleeveless jacket and wore a keffiyeh as a scarf around his neck.

Prior to its premiere, West posted up screenshots taken from the video as previews on his official blog on March 6, 2008. Exclusive behind-the-scenes images taken from the "Homecoming" video shoot later made available. Additionally, behind-the-scenes footage of the filming of the music video was later released by Channel ZeroTV. The footage reveal that several of West's friends and affiliates were present for the video shoot, including rappers Bump J of Major Figgas and Wildstyle of Crucial Conflict as well as GOOD Music recording artist Malik Yusef. The video shoot also featured appearances from Don Crowley, Virgil Abloh, Ibn Jasper, music video director Morocco Vaughn and students of Orr Academy High School. Kanye West premiered the music video for "Homecoming" through his official Vimeo account and blog on April 1, 2008.

Synopsis and reception

The music video features a monochromatic montage of West wandering throughout the many different areas of Chicago, with slow-motion shots and angles highlighting the city's streets, buildings, monuments and citizens. Among the several various locations and landmarks that he visits and are shown include the Cloud Gate sculpture at Millennium Park, DuSable Museum of African American History, Tribune Tower, Jay Pritzker Pavilion, Sears Tower, and the Cabrini–Green and Harold L. Ickes housing projects. Some of West's old friends, early supporters of his music, and local hip-hop acts such as L.E.P. Bogus Boys can be seen following him around the city. Most notably, his friend, label affiliate and fellow Chicago rapper Common, who is referenced during the song, makes two cameo appearances. Throughout the video, these scenes are interspersed with animated silhouette outlines and shots of West rapping the song's verses while surrounded by reflective mirrors on top of a moving vehicle and Chris Martin singing the chorus while playing an upright piano.

The music video was generally very well received by fans and media outlets. VH1 ranked the video for "Homecoming" as the fifth greatest music video filmed in an artist's hometown, writing, "Chi-town shinned under the spotlight in Yeezus' video 'Homecoming.' The edgy shots of Chicago were on point and Coldplay's Chris Martin was the perfect touch." On their list of Kanye West's forty-two best music videos, Complex placed the "Homecoming" video at number twenty-seven. The music video for "Homecoming" was listed at number eighty-four on BET's Notarized: Top 100 Videos of 2008 countdown. It received a nomination for Best Hip-Hop Video at the 2008 MTV Video Music Awards.

Live performances
West included "Homecoming" as one of the closing performances of the setlist on his Glow in the Dark Tour, which began on April 16, 2008 at the KeyArena in Seattle, Washington. The composition is but one of the many, various songs taken from West's first three studio albums that West utilises for his conceptual concert. They serve to form a space opera storyline that tells the tale of how a stranded space traveler struggles for over a year making attempts to escape from a distant planet while on a mission to bring creativity back to Earth. In the narrative, West performs "Homecoming" towards the end when he finally manages to return home to the planet of Earth. Near the end of the tour's North American leg, with singers and a percussionist/DJ behind him, West performed "Homecoming" during the final night of Lollapalooza 2008 in August in his hometown of Chicago, where he co-headlined the festival with Nine Inch Nails. "Homecoming" was among a list of songs that West performed during a 90-minute set when he headlined the annual dance music festival Global Gathering on July 25, 2008, becoming the very first hip-hop artist to do so. He was accompanied by backup singers, a disc jockey and three pairs of drums while the concert featured a liberal use of lighting and smoke effects.

Kanye provided a live rendition of "Homecoming" during his appearance on VH1 Storytellers on February 28, 2009. The performance wasn't included in the original broadcast but was later featured on the bonus DVD of the live album release. West performed "Homecoming" before an audience of 3,000 students during his annual free Stay In School benefit concert at the Chicago Theatre on July 11, 2009. The concert was held in an effort to raise awareness of West's charity foundation, and he later partnered with Fuse to broadcast the live performance on television on July 25, 2009. On December 31, 2010, Kanye made a surprise appearance and joined Chris Martin and rapper Jay-Z for a performance of "Homecoming" at the Marquee Nightclub during the grand opening of the luxury resort casino and hotel Cosmopolitan of Las Vegas. Jay-Z co-headlined the New Year's Eve celebration with Chris Martin and it was the very first time that West and Martin performed the song together. West performed the song live at the 2011 Coachella Festival.

Cover versions
"Homecoming" has been covered and remixed by other hip-hop artists. The Kickdrums created a mashup of "Homecoming" and the song "Ain't No Love (Heart of the City)" by rapper Jay-Z. Entitled "No Love Coming Home," the track interpolates the sung chorus of "Homecoming" and combines it with verse-raps of "Ain't No Love (Heart of the City)." It was included on Viva La Hova, a collaborative mixtape hosted by Mick Boogie and Terry Urban composed entirely of mashups of Jay-Z and Coldplay songs that was approved by both the rapper as well as the rock band.  A remix for "Homecoming" was produced by DiscoTech for inclusion on Sky High, a remix mixtape that was mixed and compiled by DJ Benzi and Plain Pat. The mixtape features remixes by various DJs and record producers of songs taken from West's first three studio albums. It was made in anticipation of the release of his fourth studio album 808s & Heartbreak. The remix project was commissioned by Kanye West himself the year prior. He handed over a cappellas and other session tapes to DJ Benzi, who then spent his time trying to match different and DJs and producers to certain tracks. Like every of the other tracks, "Homecoming" (DiscoTech Remix) had at least five revisions recorded before being completely finished. The song's instrumental was given a new club-friendly dance theme.

Rockabye Baby! featured an interpretation of "Homecoming" as the closing track of their tribute album, Rockabye Baby! Lullaby Renditions of Kanye West. Intended for infants, the gentle cover is a wordless lullaby instrumental, substituting piano chords and drums in favor of xylophones and bells. Producer Carlos Serrano created a mashup of "Homecoming" and "Born to Die" by the baroque pop singer-songwriter Lana Del Rey. Entitled "Coming to Die," the song has a sultry yet cinematic atmosphere conceived from layering the vocal track of West's emotive rapping and Chris Martin's lush singing over the sentimental "Born to Die" instrumental. The Florida production duo Urban Noize dedicated to Kanye a remix EP entitled Mr. West that features eight remixes of his songs. A remix of "Homecoming" was among them, and the sonic textures of the track's instrumentation is tailored with a laid-back jazz vibe.

Track listing

 U.S. Digital download
 "Homecoming"
International Digital download
 "Homecoming" 
 "Good Night" (featuring Mos Def and Al Be Back)
Australian CD Single:
 "Homecoming"
 "Good Night" (featuring Mos Def and Al Be Back)
European CD Single
 "Homecoming"
 "Good Night" (featuring Mos Def and Al Be Back)
UK CD Single:
 "Homecoming"
 "Good Night" (featuring Mos Def and Al Be Back)
Australian iTunes – Single
 "Homecoming"
 "Good Night" (featuring Mos Def and Al Be Back)

UK 12" single
A-side
 "Homecoming" (Album Version) 
 "Homecoming" (Instrumental)
B-side
 "Homecoming" (Album Version)   
 "Homecoming" (Instrumental)

Personnel
Information taken from Graduation liner notes.

Songwriters: Kanye West, Chris Martin, Warryn Campbell
Producers: Kanye West, Warryn Campbell
Recorders: Bruce Buechner, Andrew Dawson, Anthony Kilhoffer, Greg Koller
Mix engineer: Mike Dean, Andrew Dawson
Assistant engineers: Matty Green, Anthony Palazzole, Andy Marcinkowski

Additional vocals: Chris Martin
Percussion: Jon Brion
Sound design: Sean Cooper
Project coordinator: DJ Reflex, Sandra Campbell
Artwork: Takashi Murakami

Charts

Weekly charts

Year-end charts

Certifications

Release history

See also
List of United Kingdom Top 10 singles in 2008

References

Bibliography

External links

2007 songs
2008 singles
Kanye West songs
Music videos directed by Hype Williams
Song recordings produced by Kanye West
Song recordings produced by Warryn Campbell
Songs written by Kanye West
Songs written by Chris Martin
Songs written by Warryn Campbell
Songs about Chicago
Roc-A-Fella Records singles
Black-and-white music videos